Wordsworth McAndrew (22 November 1936 – 25 April 2008) was a leading Guyana folklorist, poet, radio broadcaster, and creative artist.

Biography
McAndrew was born on 22 November 1936 in Georgetown, British Guiana, to Winslow Alexander McAndrew and Ivy McAndrew. His father was a schoolteacher, musician and catechist, who taught in rural Anglican schools. McAndrew was raised in Cummingsburg and, from the age of 12, in Newtown, Kitty. He attended "Teacher" Marshall Kindergarten School, Christ Church Primary School and Queen's College.

Through his work as a radio broadcaster during the 1960s and 1970s, he helped the Guyanese recognize and feel proud of their mythological and folkloric heritage. He studied and celebrated Guyanese language and culture, using all media available to explain and promote Guyanese cultural characteristics.

McAndrew died on 25 April 2008, at the East Orange Hospital, in New Jersey, where he had been living in self-imposed exile. In 2015, he was posthumously awarded the Golden Arrow of Achievement by President David A. Granger.

Legacy
The Wordsworth McAndrew Award, founded in 2002 to celebrate Guyanese who have made important contributions to the country's cultural life, was named in his honour.

In 2015, Wordsworth's former wife, Rosie McAndrew, published a memoir which covers Wordsworth's Radio/TV training in England, his early broadcasting career in Guyana, their relationship, marriage and the birth of his second daughter. The book features letters written in his own words and some of his poetry.

References

External links
 "Wordsworth McAndrew - A Guyanese National Treasure", eCaroh Caribbean Emporium.
 "Wordsworth McAndrew, a pioneering Guyanese artist, has passed on", 26 April 2008.

1936 births
2008 deaths
20th-century poets
20th-century male writers
Guyanese culture
Guyanese poets
Guyanese radio presenters
Guyanese writers
People from Georgetown, Guyana